The Foghorn Leghorn is a 1948 Warner Bros. Merrie Melodies cartoon directed by Robert McKimson. The cartoon was released on October 9, 1948, and features Foghorn Leghorn, Henery Hawk and the Barnyard Dawg.

Plot
Henery Hawk's father will not allow him to go along to raid a chicken coop and capture chickens.  He says that Henery is too small, and goes on to reinforce the tall tales he has told about what a chicken looks like and how formidable they are.  After his father leaves, Henery remarks, "A fine thing.  I'm a chicken hawk and I've never even seen a chicken."  He determines to get his first one that day.

Henery's father invades a coop and struts out with a couple of traumatized chickens.  Foghorn approaches, demanding he "unhand those fair barnyard flowers", and insists on an explanation from the chicken hawk. Foghorn does not allow the bird to get a word in edgewise, however; with his stomach, the rooster bumps Henery's father across the barnyard and kicks him out. (Two years later, in A Fractured Leghorn, Foghorn uses this technique several times against a cat when the two are after the same worm).

Having arrived on the scene, Henery asks, "Hey, was that a chicken, Pop?"  His father summons some false bravado and claims he would never allow a chicken to treat him that way, that Foghorn is nothing but a "loud-mouthed shnook". A yellow stripe down his back is quite apparent as a sign of cowardice as he walks away.

On his way to find a chicken, Henery is intercepted by Foghorn and his insufferable wordplay. Finally, the chicken hawk walks away and comes upon Barnyard Dawg's house, which, due to his father's false stories about chickens, he assumes is a "chicken's cave".  He takes a hammer, hits the sleeping dog over the head, and proceeds to haul his prize across the barnyard.  Foghorn interrupts this, asking, "What's the gimmick? What's it all about?"  When Henery replies that he has just caught himself a chicken, Foghorn guffaws, saying, "That's no chicken, son. I'm a chicken. Rooster, that is." Henery does not buy this and when Foghorn asks him, "What am I then, boy?" Henery responds that he is "a loud-mouthed shnook".  Foghorn then prattles on about his identity and tells the hawk that what he thinks is a chicken is actually a dog (all while slapping Barnyard Dawg around). His position is not helped, though, when Barnyard Dawg wakes up, kicks the rooster, and calls him a shnook.

In an effort to convince Henery he is a chicken ("rooster, that is"), Foghorn pulls out a cardboard cutout of the sun and crows. This does not work; Henery walks off, leaving two signs reading "Shnook!", and "Loud Mouth'd That Is!" respectively. As Foghorn stalks across the yard, kicking the signs away and muttering to himself about how he has to straighten Henery out, the hawk comes by pushing a huge trunk. After turning to the viewers to remark, "Nice kid, but a little dumb!", the rooster proceeds to explain to Henery that he still has not captured a chicken. Foghorn emphasizes his points by regularly hitting what he thinks is the trunk; he misses the fact that it has opened and he has been, in fact, hitting Barnyard Dawg, who was inside it. Upon noticing the dog, Foghorn screams, makes a run for it, and climbs a ladder to the top floor of the barn. The dog is waiting there with a watermelon which the rooster plows his head into, then mutters, "Some days it don't pay to get outta bed!" as the dog leaves.

As a last resort, Foghorn shows Henery a photo of a roasted chicken and demonstrates how he himself would look on a platter. Henery utters, "Shnook!", and goes off to throw a lit stick of dynamite into Barnyard Dawg's house.  Knowing he will be blamed, Foghorn dives into the house in an attempt to stop the explosion. He fails and, when the smoke clears, amidst the rubble, the rooster is holding what remains of the dynamite. The enraged dog starts body-slamming Foghorn and finally calls him a "good-for-nothing chicken". This is at last enough to convince Henery, who brings a shovel down on Foghorn and begins dragging him off.

Disgusted with himself, the rooster admits, "I'm just a loud-mouthed schnook."  Henery declares, "Chicken or shnook, in our oven he'll look good!"

Home media
VHS - Warner Bros. Cartoons Golden Jubilee 24 Karat Collection: Foghorn Leghorn's Fractured Funnies 
VHS - Special Bumper Collection (Vol. 1) (UK)
VHS - Looney Tunes: The Collectors Edition, Vol. 1: All-Stars
DVD - Looney Tunes Golden Collection: Volume 1, Disc Four (original opening and credits restored)
Blu-ray, DVD - Looney Tunes Platinum Collection: Volume 2, Disc 1

Censorship
On ABC's "The Bugs Bunny & Tweety Show", The dog revealed to be inside of the trunk pushed by Henery and being pounded on the head and slapped in the face by Foghorn was excised, as too was the scene immediately after dynamite detonates in the barnyard dog's house; all that the viewer saw was the smoke of the explosion followed by the dog already in the process of throwing Foghorn to the ground in retribution for what the dog believed was Foghorn's treacherous act.
On CBS' "The Bugs Bunny/Road Runner Hour", A long sequence was deleted: Henery throws a stick of lit dynamite into the barnyard dog's house. Foghorn, fearing blame, attempts to retrieve the dynamite. Of course, it explodes in the doghouse as Foghorn has just grabbed it and is about to throw it out of the house. Foghorn looks guilty as sin with the remnant of the dynamite in his hand. The dog then slams Foghorn several times against the ground, calling him a no-good chicken. When Henery hears this, he realizes that Foghorn really is a chicken (and not a "schnook") and bashes Foghorn over the face with a shovel. With all of this cut, it appeared that Foghorn merely, "...talked (Henery) into it."

Notes
This was one of only five post-1948 WB cartoons to get a Blue Ribbon reissue prior to 1956, with the original credits cut. The others were "Daffy Dilly", "Kit for Cat", "Scaredy Cat", and "You Were Never Duckier". In 1998, for the "THIS VERSION" of the short, the original opening and credits were restored. This print was used on the Golden Collection, without the notice at the end.

References

External links
 
 

1948 animated films
1948 short films
1948 films
1940s Warner Bros. animated short films
Merrie Melodies short films
Films directed by Robert McKimson
Films scored by Carl Stalling
Foghorn Leghorn films
Animated films about dogs
Henery Hawk films
1940s English-language films
Barnyard Dawg films